There are 37 known isotopes of iodine (53I) from 108I to 144I; all undergo radioactive decay except 127I, which is stable.  Iodine is thus a monoisotopic element.

Its longest-lived radioactive isotope, 129I, has a half-life of 15.7 million years, which is far too short for it to exist as a primordial nuclide. Cosmogenic sources of 129I produce very tiny quantities of it that are too small to affect atomic weight measurements; iodine is thus also a mononuclidic element—one that is found in nature only as a single nuclide. Most 129I derived radioactivity on Earth is man-made, an unwanted long-lived byproduct of early nuclear tests and nuclear fission accidents.

All other iodine radioisotopes have half-lives less than 60 days, and four of these are used as tracers and therapeutic agents in medicine. These are 123I, 124I, 125I, and 131I. All industrial production of radioactive iodine isotopes involves these four useful radionuclides.

The isotope 135I has a half-life less than seven hours, which is too short to be used in biology. Unavoidable in situ production of this isotope is important in nuclear reactor control, as it decays to 135Xe, the most powerful known neutron absorber, and the nuclide responsible for the so-called iodine pit phenomenon.

In addition to commercial production, 131I (half-life 8 days) is one of the common radioactive fission products of nuclear fission, and is thus produced inadvertently in very large amounts inside nuclear reactors. Due to its volatility, short half-life, and high abundance in fission products, 131I (along with the short-lived iodine isotope 132I, which is produced from the decay of 132Te with a half-life of 3 days) is responsible for the largest part of radioactive contamination during the first week after accidental environmental contamination from the radioactive waste from a nuclear power plant. Thus highly dosed iodine supplements (usually potassium iodide) are given to the populace after nuclear accidents or explosions (and in some cases prior to any such incident as a civil defense mechanism) to reduce the uptake of radioactive iodine compounds by the thyroid before the highly radioactive isotopes have had time to decay.

List of isotopes 

|-
| rowspan=3|108I
| rowspan=3 style="text-align:right" | 53
| rowspan=3 style="text-align:right" | 55
| rowspan=3|107.94348(39)#
| rowspan=3|36(6) ms
| α (90%)
| 104Sb
| rowspan=3|(1)#
| rowspan=3|
| rowspan=3|
|-
| β+ (9%)
| 108Te
|-
| p (1%)
| 107Te
|-
| rowspan=2|109I
| rowspan=2 style="text-align:right" | 53
| rowspan=2 style="text-align:right" | 56
| rowspan=2|108.93815(11)
| rowspan=2|103(5) µs
| p (99.5%)
| 108Te
| rowspan=2|(5/2+)
| rowspan=2|
| rowspan=2|
|-
| α (.5%)
| 105Sb
|-
| rowspan=4|110I
| rowspan=4 style="text-align:right" | 53
| rowspan=4 style="text-align:right" | 57
| rowspan=4|109.93524(33)#
| rowspan=4|650(20) ms
| β+ (70.9%)
| 110Te
| rowspan=4|1+#
| rowspan=4|
| rowspan=4|
|-
| α (17%)
| 106Sb
|-
| β+, p (11%)
| 109Sb
|-
| β+, α (1.09%)
| 106Sn
|-
| rowspan=2|111I
| rowspan=2 style="text-align:right" | 53
| rowspan=2 style="text-align:right" | 58
| rowspan=2|110.93028(32)#
| rowspan=2|2.5(2) s
| β+ (99.92%)
| 111Te
| rowspan=2|(5/2+)#
| rowspan=2|
| rowspan=2|
|-
| α (.088%)
| 107Sb
|-
| rowspan=4|112I
| rowspan=4 style="text-align:right" | 53
| rowspan=4 style="text-align:right" | 59
| rowspan=4|111.92797(23)#
| rowspan=4|3.42(11) s
| β+ (99.01%)
| 112Te
| rowspan=4|
| rowspan=4|
| rowspan=4|
|-
| β+, p (.88%)
| 111Sb
|-
| β+, α (.104%)
| 108Sn
|-
| α (.0012%)
| 108Sb
|-
| rowspan=3|113I
| rowspan=3 style="text-align:right" | 53
| rowspan=3 style="text-align:right" | 60
| rowspan=3|112.92364(6)
| rowspan=3|6.6(2) s
| β+ (100%)
| 113Te
| rowspan=3|5/2+#
| rowspan=3|
| rowspan=3|
|-
| α (3.3×10−7%)
| 109Sb
|-
| β+, α
| 109Sn
|-
| rowspan=2|114I
| rowspan=2 style="text-align:right" | 53
| rowspan=2 style="text-align:right" | 61
| rowspan=2|113.92185(32)#
| rowspan=2|2.1(2) s
| β+
| 114Te
| rowspan=2|1+
| rowspan=2|
| rowspan=2|
|-
| β+, p (rare)
| 113Sb
|-
| rowspan=2 style="text-indent:1em" | 114mI
| rowspan=2 colspan="3" style="text-indent:2em" | 265.9(5) keV
| rowspan=2|6.2(5) s
| β+ (91%)
| 114Te
| rowspan=2|(7)
| rowspan=2|
| rowspan=2|
|-
| IT (9%)
| 114I
|-
| 115I
| style="text-align:right" | 53
| style="text-align:right" | 62
| 114.91805(3)
| 1.3(2) min
| β+
| 115Te
| (5/2+)#
|
|
|-
| 116I
| style="text-align:right" | 53
| style="text-align:right" | 63
| 115.91681(10)
| 2.91(15) s
| β+
| 116Te
| 1+
|
|
|-
| style="text-indent:1em" | 116mI
| colspan="3" style="text-indent:2em" | 400(50)# keV
| 3.27(16) µs
|
|
| (7−)
|
|
|-
| 117I
| style="text-align:right" | 53
| style="text-align:right" | 64
| 116.91365(3)
| 2.22(4) min
| β+
| 117Te
| (5/2)+
|
|
|-
| 118I
| style="text-align:right" | 53
| style="text-align:right" | 65
| 117.913074(21)
| 13.7(5) min
| β+
| 118Te
| 2−
|
|
|-
| rowspan=2 style="text-indent:1em" | 118mI
| rowspan=2 colspan="3" style="text-indent:2em" | 190.1(10) keV
| rowspan=2|8.5(5) min
| β+
| 118Te
| rowspan=2|(7−)
| rowspan=2|
| rowspan=2|
|-
| IT (rare)
| 118I
|-
| 119I
| style="text-align:right" | 53
| style="text-align:right" | 66
| 118.91007(3)
| 19.1(4) min
| β+
| 119Te
| 5/2+
|
|
|-
| 120I
| style="text-align:right" | 53
| style="text-align:right" | 67
| 119.910048(19)
| 81.6(2) min
| β+
| 120Te
| 2−
|
|
|-
| style="text-indent:1em" | 120m1I
| colspan="3" style="text-indent:2em" | 72.61(9) keV
| 228(15) ns
|
|
| (1+, 2+, 3+)
|
|
|-
| style="text-indent:1em" | 120m2I
| colspan="3" style="text-indent:2em" | 320(15) keV
| 53(4) min
| β+
| 120Te
| (7−)
|
|
|-
| 121I
| style="text-align:right" | 53
| style="text-align:right" | 68
| 120.907367(11)
| 2.12(1) h
| β+
| 121Te
| 5/2+
|
|
|-
| style="text-indent:1em" | 121mI
| colspan="3" style="text-indent:2em" | 2376.9(4) keV
| 9.0(15) µs
|
|
|
|
|
|-
| 122I
| style="text-align:right" | 53
| style="text-align:right" | 69
| 121.907589(6)
| 3.63(6) min
| β+
| 122Te
| 1+
|
|
|-
| 123I
| style="text-align:right" | 53
| style="text-align:right" | 70
| 122.905589(4)
| 13.2235(19) h
| EC
| 123Te
| 5/2+
|
|
|-
| 124I
| style="text-align:right" | 53
| style="text-align:right" | 71
| 123.9062099(25)
| 4.1760(3) d
| β+
| 124Te
| 2−
|
|
|-
| 125I
| style="text-align:right" | 53
| style="text-align:right" | 72
| 124.9046302(16)
| 59.400(10) d
| EC
| 125Te
| 5/2+
|
|
|-
| rowspan=2|126I
| rowspan=2 style="text-align:right" | 53
| rowspan=2 style="text-align:right" | 73
| rowspan=2|125.905624(4)
| rowspan=2|12.93(5) d
| β+ (56.3%)
| 126Te
| rowspan=2|2−
| rowspan=2|
| rowspan=2|
|-
| β− (43.7%)
| 126Xe
|-
| 127I
| style="text-align:right" | 53
| style="text-align:right" | 74
| 126.904473(4)
| colspan=3 align=center|Stable
| 5/2+
| 1.0000
|
|-
| rowspan=2|128I
| rowspan=2 style="text-align:right" | 53
| rowspan=2 style="text-align:right" | 75
| rowspan=2|127.905809(4)
| rowspan=2|24.99(2) min
| β− (93.1%)
| 128Xe
| rowspan=2|1+
| rowspan=2|
| rowspan=2|
|-
| β+ (6.9%)
| 128Te
|-
| style="text-indent:1em" | 128m1I
| colspan="3" style="text-indent:2em" | 137.850(4) keV
| 845(20) ns
|
|
| 4−
|
|
|-
| style="text-indent:1em" | 128m2I
| colspan="3" style="text-indent:2em" | 167.367(5) keV
| 175(15) ns
|
|
| (6)−
|
|
|-
| 129I
| style="text-align:right" | 53
| style="text-align:right" | 76
| 128.904988(3)
| 1.57(4)×107 y
| β−
| 129Xe
| 7/2+
| Trace
|
|-
| 130I
| style="text-align:right" | 53
| style="text-align:right" | 77
| 129.906674(3)
| 12.36(1) h
| β−
| 130Xe
| 5+
|
|
|-
| rowspan=2 style="text-indent:1em" | 130m1I
| rowspan=2 colspan="3" style="text-indent:2em" | 39.9525(13) keV
| rowspan=2|8.84(6) min
| IT (84%)
| 130I
| rowspan=2|2+
| rowspan=2|
| rowspan=2|
|-
| β− (16%)
| 130Xe
|-
| style="text-indent:1em" | 130m2I
| colspan="3" style="text-indent:2em" | 69.5865(7) keV
| 133(7) ns
|
|
| (6)−
|
|
|-
| style="text-indent:1em" | 130m3I
| colspan="3" style="text-indent:2em" | 82.3960(19) keV
| 315(15) ns
|
|
| -
|
|
|-
| style="text-indent:1em" | 130m4I
| colspan="3" style="text-indent:2em" | 85.1099(10) keV
| 254(4) ns
|
|
| (6)−
|
|
|-
| 131I
| style="text-align:right" | 53
| style="text-align:right" | 78
| 130.9061246(12)
| 8.02070(11) d
| β−
| 131Xe
| 7/2+
|
|
|-
| 132I
| style="text-align:right" | 53
| style="text-align:right" | 79
| 131.907997(6)
| 2.295(13) h
| β−
| 132Xe
| 4+
|
|
|-
| rowspan=2 style="text-indent:1em" | 132mI
| rowspan=2 colspan="3" style="text-indent:2em" | 104(12) keV
| rowspan=2|1.387(15) h
| IT (86%)
| 132I
| rowspan=2|(8−)
| rowspan=2|
| rowspan=2|
|-
| β− (14%)
| 132Xe
|-
| 133I
| style="text-align:right" | 53
| style="text-align:right" | 80
| 132.907797(5)
| 20.8(1) h
| β−
| 133Xe
| 7/2+
|
|
|-
| style="text-indent:1em" | 133m1I
| colspan="3" style="text-indent:2em" | 1634.174(17) keV
| 9(2) s
| IT
| 133I
| (19/2−)
|
|
|-
| style="text-indent:1em" | 133m2I
| colspan="3" style="text-indent:2em" | 1729.160(17) keV
| ~170 ns
|
|
| (15/2−)
|
|
|-
| 134I
| style="text-align:right" | 53
| style="text-align:right" | 81
| 133.909744(9)
| 52.5(2) min
| β−
| 134Xe
| (4)+
|
|
|-
| rowspan=2 style="text-indent:1em" | 134mI
| rowspan=2 colspan="3" style="text-indent:2em" | 316.49(22) keV
| rowspan=2|3.52(4) min
| IT (97.7%)
| 134I
| rowspan=2|(8)−
| rowspan=2|
| rowspan=2|
|-
| β− (2.3%)
| 134Xe
|-
| 135I
| style="text-align:right" | 53
| style="text-align:right" | 82
| 134.910048(8)
| 6.57(2) h
| β−
| 135Xe
| 7/2+
|
|
|-
| 136I
| style="text-align:right" | 53
| style="text-align:right" | 83
| 135.91465(5)
| 83.4(10) s
| β−
| 136Xe
| (1−)
|
|
|-
| style="text-indent:1em" | 136mI
| colspan="3" style="text-indent:2em" | 650(120) keV
| 46.9(10) s
| β−
| 136Xe
| (6−)
|
|
|-
| rowspan=2|137I
| rowspan=2 style="text-align:right" | 53
| rowspan=2 style="text-align:right" | 84
| rowspan=2|136.917871(30)
| rowspan=2|24.13(12) s
| β− (92.86%)
| 137Xe
| rowspan=2|(7/2+)
| rowspan=2|
| rowspan=2|
|-
| β−, n (7.14%)
| 136Xe
|-
| rowspan=2|138I
| rowspan=2 style="text-align:right" | 53
| rowspan=2 style="text-align:right" | 85
| rowspan=2|137.92235(9)
| rowspan=2|6.23(3) s
| β− (94.54%)
| 138Xe
| rowspan=2|(2−)
| rowspan=2|
| rowspan=2|
|-
| β−, n (5.46%)
| 137Xe
|-
| rowspan=2|139I
| rowspan=2 style="text-align:right" | 53
| rowspan=2 style="text-align:right" | 86
| rowspan=2|138.92610(3)
| rowspan=2|2.282(10) s
| β− (90%)
| 139Xe
| rowspan=2|7/2+#
| rowspan=2|
| rowspan=2|
|-
| β−, n (10%)
| 138Xe
|-
| rowspan=2|140I
| rowspan=2 style="text-align:right" | 53
| rowspan=2 style="text-align:right" | 87
| rowspan=2|139.93100(21)#
| rowspan=2|860(40) ms
| β− (90.7%)
| 140Xe
| rowspan=2|(3)(−#)
| rowspan=2|
| rowspan=2|
|-
| β−, n (9.3%)
| 139Xe
|-
| rowspan=2|141I
| rowspan=2 style="text-align:right" | 53
| rowspan=2 style="text-align:right" | 88
| rowspan=2|140.93503(21)#
| rowspan=2|430(20) ms
| β− (78%)
| 141Xe
| rowspan=2|7/2+#
| rowspan=2|
| rowspan=2|
|-
| β−, n (22%)
| 140Xe
|-
| rowspan=2|142I
| rowspan=2 style="text-align:right" | 53
| rowspan=2 style="text-align:right" | 89
| rowspan=2|141.94018(43)#
| rowspan=2|~200 ms
| β− (75%)
| 142Xe
| rowspan=2|2−#
| rowspan=2|
| rowspan=2|
|-
| β−, n (25%)
| 141Xe
|-
| 143I
| style="text-align:right" | 53
| style="text-align:right" | 90
| 142.94456(43)#
| 100# ms [> 300 ns]
| β−
| 143Xe
| 7/2+#
|
|
|-
| 144I
| style="text-align:right" | 53
| style="text-align:right" | 91
| 143.94999(54)#
| 50# ms [> 300 ns]
| β−
| 144Xe
| 1−#
|
|

Notable radioisotopes

Radioisotopes of iodine are called radioactive iodine or radioiodine. Dozens exist, but about a half dozen are the most notable in applied sciences such as the life sciences and nuclear power, as detailed below. Mentions of radioiodine in health care contexts refer more often to iodine-131 than to other isotopes.

Of the many isotopes of iodine, only two are typically used in a medical setting: iodine-123 and iodine-131. Since 131I has both a beta and gamma decay mode, it can be used for radiotherapy or for imaging. 123I, which has no beta activity, is more suited for routine nuclear medicine imaging of the thyroid and other medical processes and less damaging internally to the patient. There are some situations in which iodine-124 and iodine-125 are also used in medicine.

Due to preferential uptake of iodine by the thyroid, radioiodine is extensively used in imaging of and, in the case of 131I, destroying dysfunctional thyroid tissues. Other types of tissue selectively take up certain iodine-131-containing tissue-targeting and killing radiopharmaceutical agents (such as MIBG). Iodine-125 is the only other iodine radioisotope used in radiation therapy, but only as an implanted capsule in brachytherapy, where the isotope never has a chance to be released for chemical interaction with the body's tissues.

Iodine-123 and iodine-125 

The gamma-emitting isotopes iodine-123 (half-life 13 hours), and (less commonly) the longer-lived and less energetic iodine-125 (half-life 59 days) are used as nuclear imaging tracers to evaluate the anatomic and physiologic function of the thyroid. Abnormal results may be caused by disorders such as Graves' disease or Hashimoto's thyroiditis. Both isotopes decay by electron capture (EC) to the corresponding tellurium nuclides, but in neither case are these the metastable nuclides 123mTe and 125mTe (which are of higher energy, and are not produced from radioiodine). Instead, the excited tellurium nuclides decay immediately (half-life too short to detect). Following EC, the excited 123Te from 123I emits a high-speed 127 keV internal conversion electron (not a beta ray) about 13% of the time, but this does little cellular damage due to the nuclide's short half-life and the relatively small fraction of such events. In the remainder of cases, a 159 keV gamma ray is emitted, which is well-suited for gamma imaging.

Excited 125Te resulting from electron capture of 125I also emits a much lower-energy internal conversion electron (35.5 keV), which does relatively little damage due to its low energy, even though its emission is more common. The relatively low-energy gamma from 125I/125Te decay is poorly suited for imaging, but can still be seen, and this longer-lived isotope is necessary in tests that require several days of imaging, for example, fibrinogen scan imaging to detect blood clots.

Both 123I and 125I emit copious low energy Auger electrons after their decay, but these do not cause serious damage (double-stranded DNA breaks) in cells, unless the nuclide is incorporated into a medication that accumulates in the nucleus, or into DNA (this is never the case is clinical medicine, but it has been seen in experimental animal models).

Iodine-125 is also commonly used by radiation oncologists in low dose rate brachytherapy in the treatment of cancer at sites other than the thyroid, especially in prostate cancer. When 125I is used therapeutically, it is encapsulated in titanium seeds and implanted in the area of the tumor, where it remains. The low energy of the gamma spectrum in this case limits radiation damage to tissues far from the implanted capsule. Iodine-125, due to its suitable longer half-life and less penetrating gamma spectrum, is also often preferred for laboratory tests that rely on iodine as a tracer that is counted by a gamma counter, such as in radioimmunoassaying.

I is used as the radiolabel in investigating which ligands go to which plant pattern recognition receptors (PRRs).

Iodine-124 
Iodine-124 is a proton-rich isotope of iodine with a half-life of 4.18 days. Its modes of decay are: 74.4% electron capture, 25.6% positron emission. 124I decays to 124Te. Iodine-124 can be made by numerous nuclear reactions via a cyclotron. The most common starting material used is 124Te.

Iodine-124 as the iodide salt can be used to directly image the thyroid using positron emission tomography (PET). Iodine-124 can also be used as a PET radiotracer with a usefully longer half-life compared with fluorine-18. In this use, the nuclide is chemically bonded to a pharmaceutical to form a positron-emitting radiopharmaceutical, and injected into the body, where again it is imaged by PET scan.

Iodine-129

Iodine-129 (129I; half-life 15.7 million years) is a product of cosmic ray spallation on various isotopes of xenon in the atmosphere, in cosmic ray muon interaction with tellurium-130, and also uranium and plutonium fission, both in subsurface rocks and nuclear reactors. Artificial nuclear processes, in particular nuclear fuel reprocessing and atmospheric nuclear weapons tests, have now swamped the natural signal for this isotope. Nevertheless, it now serves as a groundwater tracer as indicator of nuclear waste dispersion into the natural environment. In a similar fashion, 129I was used in rainwater studies to track fission products following the Chernobyl disaster.

In some ways, 129I is similar to 36Cl. It is a soluble halogen, exists mainly as a non-sorbing anion, and is produced by cosmogenic, thermonuclear, and in-situ reactions. In hydrologic studies, 129I concentrations are usually reported as the ratio of 129I to total I (which is virtually all 127I). As is the case with 36Cl/Cl, 129I/I ratios in nature are quite small, 10−14 to 10−10 (peak thermonuclear 129I/I during the 1960s and 1970s reached about 10−7). 129I differs from 36Cl in that its half-life is longer (15.7 vs. 0.301 million years), it is highly biophilic, and occurs in multiple ionic forms (commonly, I− and IO3−), which have different chemical behaviors. This makes it fairly easy for 129I to enter the biosphere as it becomes incorporated into vegetation, soil, milk, animal tissue, etc.
Excesses of stable 129Xe in meteorites have been shown to result from decay of "primordial" iodine-129 produced newly by the supernovas that created the dust and gas from which the solar system formed. This isotope has long decayed and is thus referred to as "extinct". Historically, 129I was the first extinct radionuclide to be identified as present in the early Solar System. Its decay is the basis of the I-Xe iodine-xenon radiometric dating scheme, which covers the first 85 million years of Solar System evolution.

Iodine-131

Iodine-131 is a beta-emitting isotope with a half-life of eight days, and comparatively energetic (190 keV average and 606 keV maximum energy) beta radiation, which penetrates 0.6 to 2.0 mm from the site of uptake. This beta radiation can be used for the destruction of thyroid nodules or hyperfunctioning thyroid tissue and for elimination of remaining thyroid tissue after surgery for the treatment of Graves' disease. The purpose of this therapy, which was first explored by Dr. Saul Hertz in 1941, is to destroy thyroid tissue that could not be removed surgically. In this procedure, 131I is administered either intravenously or orally following a diagnostic scan. This procedure may also be used, with higher doses of radio-iodine, to treat patients with thyroid cancer.

The 131I is taken up into thyroid tissue and concentrated there. The beta particles emitted by the radioisotope destroys the associated thyroid tissue with little damage to surrounding tissues (more than 2.0 mm from the tissues absorbing the iodine). Due to similar destruction, 131I is the iodine radioisotope used in other water-soluble iodine-labeled radiopharmaceuticals (such as MIBG) used therapeutically to destroy tissues.

The high energy beta radiation (up to 606 keV) from 131I causes it to be the most carcinogenic of the iodine isotopes. It is thought to cause the majority of excess thyroid cancers seen after nuclear fission contamination (such as bomb fallout or severe nuclear reactor accidents like the Chernobyl disaster) However, these epidemiological effects are seen primarily in children, and treatment of adults and children with therapeutic 131I, and epidemiology of adults exposed to low-dose 131I has not demonstrated carcinogenicity.

Iodine-135
Iodine-135 is an isotope of iodine with a half-life of 6.6 hours. It is an important isotope from the viewpoint of nuclear reactor physics. It is produced in relatively large amounts as a fission product, and decays to xenon-135, which is a nuclear poison with a very large thermal neutron cross section, which is a cause of multiple complications in the control of nuclear reactors. The process of buildup of xenon-135 from accumulated iodine-135 can temporarily preclude a shut-down reactor from restarting. This is known as xenon poisoning or "falling into an iodine pit".

Iodine-128 and other isotopes

Iodine fission-produced isotopes not discussed above (iodine-128, iodine-130, iodine-132, and iodine-133) have half-lives of several hours or minutes, rendering them almost useless in other applicable areas. Those mentioned are neutron-rich and undergo beta decay to isotopes of xenon. Iodine-128 (half-life 25 minutes) can decay to either tellurium-128 by electron capture or to xenon-128 by beta decay.

Nonradioactive iodide (127I) as protection from unwanted radioiodine uptake by the thyroid

Colloquially, radioactive materials can be described as "hot," and non-radioactive materials can be described as "cold."  There are instances in which cold iodide is administered to people in order to prevent the uptake of hot iodide by the thyroid gland.  For example, blockade of thyroid iodine uptake with potassium iodide is used in nuclear medicine scintigraphy and therapy with some radioiodinated compounds that are not targeted to the thyroid, such as iobenguane (MIBG), which is used to image or treat neural tissue tumors, or iodinated fibrinogen, which is used in fibrinogen scans to investigate clotting.  These compounds contain iodine, but not in the iodide form.  However, since they may be ultimately metabolized or break down to radioactive iodide, it is common to administer non-radioactive potassium iodide to insure that metabolites of these  radiopharmaceuticals is not sequestered by thyroid gland and inadvertently administer a radiological dose to that tissue.

Potassium iodide has been distributed to populations exposed to nuclear fission accidents such as the Chernobyl disaster. The iodide solution SSKI, a saturated solution of potassium (K) iodide in water, has been used to block absorption of the radioiodine (it has no effect on other radioisotopes from fission). Tablets containing potassium iodide are now also manufactured and stocked in central disaster sites by some governments for this purpose. In theory, many harmful late-cancer effects of nuclear fallout might be prevented in this way, since an excess of thyroid cancers, presumably due to radioiodine uptake, is the only proven radioisotope contamination effect after a fission accident, or from contamination by fallout from an atomic bomb (prompt radiation from the bomb also causes other cancers, such as leukemias, directly). Taking large amounts of iodide saturates thyroid receptors and prevents uptake of most radioactive iodine-131 that may be present from fission product exposure (although it does not protect from other radioisotopes, nor from any other form of direct radiation). The protective effect of KI lasts approximately 24 hours, so must be dosed daily until a risk of significant exposure to radioiodines from fission products no longer exists. Iodine-131 (the most common radioiodine contaminant in fallout) also decays relatively rapidly with a half-life of eight days, so that 99.95% of the original radioiodine has vanished after three months.

References
 Isotope masses from:

 Isotopic compositions and standard atomic masses from:

 Half-life, spin, and isomer data selected from the following sources.

External links
Iodine isotopes data from The Berkeley Laboratory Isotopes Project's
Iodine-128, Iodine-130, Iodine-132 data from 'Wolframalpha'

 
Iodine
Iodine
Nuclear safety and security